Tell the World may refer to:

 Tell the World (Daniel DeBourg album), 2002
 Tell the World (Pandora album), 1995
 "Tell the World" (Pandora song), 1994
 Tell the World: The Very Best of Ratt, a 2007 career-spanning compilation album by Ratt
 "Tell the World", a song by Ratt from the EP Ratt
 Tell the World (Kristina Maria album), 2012
 "Wheels", a hit released 1960 by the String-a-Longs, which they composed as "Tell the World"